Stadionul Vasile Enache is a multi-use stadium in Modelu, Romania. It is currently used mostly for football matches and is the home ground of Înainte Modelu. The stadium holds 1,000 people.

External links
Stadionul Vasile Enache at soccerway.com

Football venues in Romania
Buildings and structures in Călărași County